The Campeonato Maranhense is the football league of the state of Maranhão, Brazil.

Clubs
2021 First Division

Bacabal Esporte Clube
Sociedade Esportiva Juventude
Instituto de Administração de Projetos Educacionais Futebol Clube (IAPE)
Sociedade Imperatriz de Desportos
Moto Club de São Luís
Pinheiro Atlético Clube
Sampaio Corrêa Futebol Clube
São José de Ribamar Esporte Clube

List of champions

Titles by team

Teams in bold stills active.

By city

Copa Federação Maranhense de Futebol
The Copa Federação Maranhense de Futebol is a competition contested in the second semester of the year, by Maranhão state teams, to determine a spot in the following year's Campeonato Brasileiro Série D and Copa do Brasil. The competition was previously called Taça Cidade de São Luís (1967 until 2009), Copa União do Maranhão (2010, 2011 and 2012) and Copa São Luis (2013) before switching to current name in 2018.

List of champions

 1967: Maranhão
 1968: Maranhão
 1969: Maranhão
 1970: Maranhão
 1971: Maranhão
 1972: Moto Club
 1973: Sampaio Corrêa
 1974: Ferroviário
 1975: Maranhão
 1976: Sampaio Corrêa
 1977: Not held
 1978: Moto Club
 1979: Maranhão
 1980: Maranhão
 1981: Moto Club
 1982: Moto Club
 1983: Sampaio Corrêa
 1984: Sampaio Corrêa
 1985: Moto Club
 1986: Not held
 1987: Maranhão
 1988: Imperatriz
 1989: Maranhão
 1990: Sampaio Corrêa
 1991: Bacabal
 1992: Not held
 1993: Moto Club
 1994–2001: Not held
 2002: Sampaio Corrêa
 2003: Moto Club
 2004: Moto Club
 2005: Not held
 2006: Maranhão
 2007: Sampaio Corrêa
 2008: Bacabal
 2009: Sampaio Corrêa
 2010: IAPE
 2011: Sampaio Corrêa
 2012: Sampaio Corrêa
 2013: Sampaio Corrêa
 2014–2017: Not held
 2018: Maranhão
 2019: Juventude
 2020: Cancelled
 2021: Tuntum
 2022: Tuntum

Titles by team
Maranhão 12 titles
Sampaio Corrêa 11 titles
Moto Club 8 titles
Bacabal and Tuntum 2 titles
Ferroviário, Imperatriz, IAPE and Juventude 1 title

References
 Campeonato Maranhense at RSSSF

Maranhense